Future Shock is a television variety show produced and hosted by James Brown from 1976 to 1979. Shot in Augusta and Atlanta, Georgia and broadcast late on Friday nights on the Ted Turner-owned UHF station WTCG, it featured local amateurs performing a variety of popular and emerging dance styles, including disco, locking and popping, and early breakdancing, to prerecorded music. Brown and his musical guests also performed briefly. Other regular features included dance contests, interviews, and segments on African-American history. "Future Shock (Dance Your Pants Off)", a song written by Brown and recorded by Maceo Parker with The J.B.'s, served as the show's nominal theme music, though it was not consistently used.

Following the example of Soul Train, Future Shock was syndicated nationwide in the United States, but it failed to attract sponsors and ceased production within three years. It has not been officially released on recorded media, and with the exception of a handful of episodes recordings of the show have long been presumed lost.

References

External links
 A collection of Future Shock footage curated by WFMU
 Future Shock Episode 13
 Future Shock Episode 14
 Unknown Future Shock episode
 Unknown Future Shock episode

James Brown
1970s American music television series
Dance television shows
Pop music television series
English-language television shows
Lost television shows